Kraków is a Polish parliamentary constituency that is coterminous with the Lesser Poland Voivodeship.  It elects fourteen members of the Sejm.

The district has the number '13' for elections to the Sejm and is named after the city of Kraków.  For elections to the Sejm, it includes the counties of Brzeg, Kraków, Miechów, and Olkusz and the city county of Kraków.  For elections to the Senate, it also includes the counties of Chrzanów, Myślenice, Oświęcim, Sucha, and Wadowice.

List of members

Sejm

Footnotes

Electoral districts of Poland
Kraków
Lesser Poland Voivodeship